Donald Joseph Ciccone (February 28, 1946 – October 8, 2016) was an American singer, songwriter and musician. He was a founding member of the pop group the Critters, singing their biggest hits "Younger Girl" and "Mr. Dieingly Sad". The latter he wrote about his girlfriend Kathy Cobb before he entered the Air Force during the time of the Vietnam War.  Cobb later became his wife.  When the Critters' first album started to take off, Ciccone was in the Air Force and the band had to tour without him. This is why many videos on YouTube do not feature him, but instead have Ken Gorka lip-syncing Ciccone's part.

Ciccone was born in Jersey City, New Jersey on February 28, 1946. He was the son of an immigrant father, Vito Ciccone, who owned and operated Bill Williams Auto Sales in the 1950s. From the age of 5, Ciccone grew up in a 56-room mansion in Plainfield, New Jersey. In the 1970s, Ciccone joined the Four Seasons, where he played guitar and bass and contributed lead vocals to songs including "December, 1963 (Oh, What a Night)" and "Rhapsody". After the Four Seasons, he joined Tommy James and the Shondells as their bassist through 1987.

During his time with the Critters, he wrote "Mr. Dieingly Sad", produced by Artie Ripp, which reached #17 for the group. He also wrote and recorded "There's Got to be a Word", which was later recorded and released by the Innocence in December 1966. Their version reached #34 on the charts.

Ciccone also performed with the band The Hit Men - other members included his former Four Seasons band mates Lee Shapiro and Gerry Polci.

Ciccone, who was a long time resident of Ridgewood, New Jersey and Port Saint Lucie, Florida had moved to Sun Valley, Idaho, a few years before he died of a heart attack on October 8, 2016 in adjacent Ketchum at the age of 70.

References

External links

1946 births
2016 deaths
American male singer-songwriters
The Four Seasons (band) members
Musicians from Jersey City, New Jersey
People from Sun Valley, Idaho
Tommy James and the Shondells members
Singer-songwriters from New York (state)
Singer-songwriters from New Jersey
Singer-songwriters from Idaho